The 2015–16 Niagara Purple Eagles men's basketball team represented Niagara University during the 2015–16 NCAA Division I men's basketball season. The Purple Eagles, led by third year head coach Chris Casey, played their home games at the Gallagher Center and were members of the Metro Atlantic Athletic Conference. They finished the season 7–25, 5–15 in MAAC play to finish in tenth place. They lost in the first round of the MAAC tournament to Canisius.

Roster

Schedule

|-
!colspan=9 style="background:#4F2170; color:#FFFFFF;"| Regular season

|-
!colspan=9 style="background:#4F2170; color:#FFFFFF;"| MAAC tournament

References

Niagara Purple Eagles men's basketball seasons
Niagara